Grace Rebecca Fisk (born 5 January 1998) is an English footballer who plays as a defender for Women's Super League club West Ham United and has represented the England national team at youth level.

Club career

Youth career
Fisk joined Millwall Lionesses age 10, rising from the Centre of Excellence to the Development Squad. In 2014, she became the youngest player to debut for the Millwall Lionesses senior team when she did so at age 16, and was named the club's Young Player of the Year in 2015.

College career
In 2016, Fisk moved to the United States to play collegiately for Penn State Nittany Lions of the Big Ten Conference and started 18 of Penn State's 21 matches as a freshman. For her sophomore year, Fisk transferred to SEC team South Carolina Gamecocks. In 2019, Fisk was an ever-present in a Gamecocks backline that achieved the second most shutouts in the country with 17 on the way to winning the SEC Championship with Fisk named as tournament MVP. She was named SEC Defensive Player of the Year in all three seasons at South Carolina.

West Ham United
On 30 December 2019, Fisk returned to England to sign with FA WSL team West Ham United. She made her debut on 12 January 2020, starting in a 2–1 WSL defeat away to Tottenham Hotspur.

International career

Youth level
Fisk has represented England at under-17, under-19, under-20 and under-21 level. Having scored twice against Bulgaria in qualifying, Fisk started all three games for England at the 2015 UEFA Women's Under-17 Championship as the team were knocked out at the group stage. Fisk also appeared in every game at the 2017 UEFA Women's Under-19 Championship where England finished in 5th place, beating Scotland in the U20 World Cup qualifying play-off. Fisk captained the England squad that won a bronze medal at the 2018 U20 World Cup in France, beating the host nation on penalties in the third place match.

Senior team
In February 2020, Fisk received her first senior England call-up as part of the 2020 SheBelieves Cup squad.

Career statistics

Club
.

Honours

College
South Carolina Gamecocks
SEC Women's Soccer Tournament: 2019

International
England U20
FIFA U-20 Women's World Cup third place: 2018

Individual
 SEC Defensive Player of the Year: 2017, 2018, 2019

References

External links

 Profile at South Carolina Gamecocks
 Profile at the West Ham United F.C. website
 Profile at the Football Association website
 
 

Living people
1998 births
Footballers from Bromley
Penn State Nittany Lions women's soccer players
South Carolina Gamecocks women's soccer players
English women's footballers
Women's association football defenders
English expatriate women's footballers
English expatriate sportspeople in the United States
Expatriate women's soccer players in the United States
Millwall Lionesses L.F.C. players
West Ham United F.C. Women players
Women's Super League players